Dos vidas (English title: Double lifes) is a Mexican telenovela produced by Eugenio Cobo for Televisa in 1988. It is an original story by Janete Clair, adapted by Jorge Patiño and directed by Benjamín Cann.

Rebecca Jones and René Casados starred as protagonists, Elizabeth Dupeyrón and Guillermo García Cantú starred as co-protagonists, while Fernando Balzaretti starred as stellar performance.

Plot
Teresa is a beautiful woman, born in Mazatlán, which may well seem like any other woman, but that really has to deal with an internal struggle over whether to rescue their individuality or resign themselves to the submissive life be imposed by a man. Displays the subjugation of women to men, whether or not voluntary.

Cast 
Rebecca Jones as Teresa
Fernando Balzaretti as Dr. Marcelo Ascencio
René Casados as Dino Barbosa
Ari Telch as Osvaldo "Vado" Palas
Mariana Garza as Juliana Ascencio
Guillermo García Cantú as Mauricio
Guillermo Orea as Menelao Palas
Manuel López Ochoa as Don Raúl
Ana Bertha Lepe
Mario León as Tulio Barbosa
Rafael del Villar as Luis Carlos
Lilia Michel as Doña Rosa
Alicia Fahr as Claudia
Mar Castro as Gilda
Miguel Gómez Checa as Sena
Bárbara Gil as Doña Leonor
Rosa María Morett as Lucía
Rocío Yaber as Sara
Guy De Saint Cyr as Tomás Palas
Elizabeth Dupeyrón as Sonia Palas
Marcela Páez as Vera
Julia Marichal as Mary
Ana Silvia Garza
David Ostrosky
Gerardo Acuña
Graciela Bernardos
Magda Karina as Eloisa
Jorge Patiño
Guillermo Gil
Edith Kleiman
Gabriela Obregón as Selma
Mauricio Zetina as Teo Palas
Jorge Fegán
Sergio Sánchez
Graciela Orozco

Awards

References

External links

1988 telenovelas
Mexican telenovelas
1988 Mexican television series debuts
1988 Mexican television series endings
Television shows set in Mexico City
Televisa telenovelas
Mexican television series based on Brazilian television series
Spanish-language telenovelas